Alaska is an unincorporated community located on Wisconsin Highway 42 in the town of Pierce, Kewaunee County, Wisconsin. Alaska falls between East Alaska Lake and West Alaska Lake and is an important tourist and fishing spot. As well as home to Troop 3 Alaska in the area, it is also home to the Alaskan Golf Club, a public course located on East Alaska Lake.

The community was named after the Alaska Territory, and was done so because the community's post office was established the same year that the United States acquired Alaska from Russia.

Gallery

References

Unincorporated communities in Kewaunee County, Wisconsin
Unincorporated communities in Wisconsin